Justice Ward may refer to:

Daniel P. Ward (1918–1995), associate justice of the Supreme Court of Illinois
Hortense Sparks Ward (1872–1944), special chief justice of a special all-female Texas Supreme Court convened in 1925
Paul Ward (Arkansas judge) (1980–1972), associate justice of the Arkansas Supreme Court
Terry W. Ward (1885–1929), associate justice of the Supreme Court of California

See also
Judge Ward (disambiguation)